Spiros Focás (born 17 August 1937) is a Greek actor.

Selected filmography

  (1959) - Giannos
  (1959) - Tasos Lygos
  (1959) - Alekos
 Death of a Friend (1959) - Bruno
  (1960) - Lucio Massimo
 Rocco and His Brothers (1960) - Vincenzo Parondi
  (1961) - Ilias
  (1961) - Pietro, l'autista
 Run with the Devil (1960) - Marco Belli
 Eighteen in the Sun (1962) - Johnny
 A Man for Burning (1962) - Jachino
  (1962)
  (1964) - Kostas
 A Bullet Through the Heart (1966) - Navarra
 The Fear (1966) - Nikos
  (1966) - Giorgos Daponte
 Queen of Clubs (1966) - Alexandros
  (1966)
  (1966) - Stefos Pergamos
  (1967) - Giovanni
 Hate Thy Neighbor (1968) - Ken Dakota
  (1968) - Hristos Sgouros
  (1968) - Petros
  (1968) - Timos
 Zorro in the Court of England (1969) - Pedro Suarez / Zorro
  (1970)
  (1970) - Fernando
 Lover of the Great Bear (1971) - Alfred
  (1972)
 I Kiss the Hand (1973) - Luca Ferrante
 Shaft in Africa (1973) - Sassari
 Flavia the Heretic (1974) - the French Duke
 Mark Shoots First (1975) - Morini
  (1975)
 A Matter of Time (1976) - (uncredited)
 Holocaust 2000 (1977) - Harbin
  (1979)
  (1979)
  (1979)
 Sonia (1980) - Tonio
  (1981) - Iasonas
  (1981)
  (1981)
  (1981) - Petros Georgiou
  (1982) - Petros Parisis
  (1983) - Nikos
 The Jewel of the Nile (1985) - Omar
 Fout Bol (1985)
 Black Tunnel (1986) - Colonel Jack Roth
 Rambo III (1988) - Masoud
  (1990) - Anthony Bassouri - il socio di Leporino
 White Palace (1990) - George (uncredited)
 The Serpent of Death (1990) - Stavros
  (1992) - Triandafillos
  (1994)
  (1995)
  (1996)
  (1997)
  (1999)
  (2000) - Marios Venieris
  (2002)
  (2002)
  (2003) - Uncle
  (2003)
  (2003)
  (2003)
 448 BC: Olympiad of Ancient Hellas (2004) - Empedocles
 A Simple Love Story (2007)
  (2009)
 Bring them back (2010)
  (2014) - Fotis
  (2015)
 Raw Trip (2016) - Sheriff
  (2017)
 Outlanders 2018 (2018)
 The Club - Mr. Martino

External links

Greek male film actors
Greek male television actors
Actors from Patras
1937 births
Living people